Maldives competed at the 2017 Asian Indoor and Martial Arts Games held in Ashgabat, Turkmenistan from September 17 to 27. Maldives couldn't receive any medal at the Games.

Participants

References 

Nations at the 2017 Asian Indoor and Martial Arts Games
Sport in the Maldives